Bloodie is a 1998 Czech puzzle video game for MS-DOS.

Development
The game began life as a demo program and variation of Boovie, and it uses the same graphics engine as the other game. The game is similar to the Moorhuhn series.

Reception
Bonusweb.cz felt the game was great and entertaining as few games are. Doupe.cz felt the graphics and music were decent and held up in the 2010s.

References

1998 video games
DOS games
DOS-only games
Freeware games
Puzzle video games
Video games developed in the Czech Republic